is a Japanese voice actress from Hyōgo. She is affiliated with Aoni Production. She is member of the voice actress singing unit Earphones.

Filmography

Anime
2014
Medamayaki no Kimi Itsu Tsubusu?, Aki
Kutsudaru, Chika-chan

2015
Seiyu's Life!,  Ichigo Moesaki
Marvel Disk Wars: The Avengers, Citizen

2016
Dragon Ball Super, Angel
Sailor Moon Crystal, Mimete 
Samurai Warriors, Maid B
Persona 5: The Animation -The Day Breakers-, 
Lupin III

2017
Akiba's Trip: The Animation, Arisa Ahokainen
Magical Circle Guru Guru, Ena
Hajimete no Gal, Yukana Yame 
Kaito x Ansa, 
Clione no Akari,  Goldfish scoop and shopkeeper
Elegant Yokai Apartment Life, Enoue
Anime-Gatari, Satori

2018
A Place Further Than The Universe, Female student (ep 1)
Ms. Koizumi Loves Ramen Noodles, Gal

2019
The Price of Smiles, Lily Earhart
YU-NO: A Girl Who Chants Love at the Bound of this World, Kun-Kun

Video games
2012
Monster Retsuden Oreca Battle
2013
Atelier Escha & Logy: Alchemists of the Dusk Sky -

2015
MÚSECA（Maica）
Otoca Doll - Koko
2018
Master of Eternity- Naiz
MapleStory - Ark (Female)

Tokusatsu
2020
Mashin Sentai Kiramager - Mashin Helico

References

External links
Official agency profile 

Living people
Voice actresses from Hyōgo Prefecture
Japanese video game actresses
Japanese voice actresses
King Records (Japan) artists
Earphones (band) members
Year of birth missing (living people)
Aoni Production voice actors